Fališi is a village in the municipality of Foča, Republika Srpska, Bosnia and Herzegovina. It is located close to the border.

References

Villages in Republika Srpska
Populated places in Foča